Sa Puso Ko Iingatan Ka (International Name: My Heart, Take Care / ) is a Philippine daytime drama series made by ABS-CBN. It aired from June 18, 2001 to February 14, 2003. The show starred Judy Ann Santos and Piolo Pascual.

The series re-aired Internationally from 2004 to 2006 on Pinoy Central TV (now S+A International) and with back-to-back episodes on Cinema One Global from November 2012 to 2013 part of its Drama Hour replacing Kampanerang Kuba re-runs.

Plot
A Young woman Patricia is trying to find true acceptance and love from her father (Edu Manzano). After being born out of wedlock she must also succumb to get through her daily emotional ordeals such as her complicated family life with her mother and drunken lover her cruel stepsister and her grandmother. She will fall in love in the process with Jordan a young man who will fall for her heart. But will there love story get a happily ever after?

The story revolves around Patricia (Judy Ann Santos) and her search for a comfortable life. Patricia, born out of wedlock to parents Armand Montecillo (Edu Manzano) and his secretary-turned-lover Nieves Quevado (Zsa Zsa Padilla), had to face various challenges and tribulations, including living with an alcoholic abusive stepfather Abner (Pen Medina) and experiencing cruelty from her step sister Sheila (Julia Clarete). However, hope arrives as she meets Jordan (Piolo Pascual) who promises eternal love. Patricia and Jordan marry and face the wounds of their pasts.

Can greed and power destroy others or can love and determination heal all types of wounds?

In the end, Patricia is revealed to be the long-lost biological daughter of Armand with Mayla (Coney Reyes), who was initially her stepmother. Nieves is actually Patricia's adoptive mother who had a son with Armand, named Chandro (Romnick Sarmenta) was stole by Dr. Enriquez (Timmy Cruz) she's adoptive mother. Meanwhile, Sheila, believed to be Armand and Mayla's daughter, is actually the long-lost biological daughter of Star (Cherie Gil).

Cast

Lead
 Judy Ann Santos as Patricia Montecillo-Villamines
 Piolo Pascual as Jordan Villamines

Main
 Coney Reyes as Mayla Lizandro-Montecillo - Patricia (biological), Sheila (adoptive) & Adrian's mother, but she's supposed to be a stepmother of Patricia in first scene.
 Edu Manzano as Armand Montecillo † - Chandro, Patricia & Adrian's father and Sheila's adoptive father
 Zsa Zsa Padilla as Nieves Quevedo-Pacheco † - Patricia (adoptive), Abby & Chandro's mother.
 Julia Clarete as Sheila Montecillo-Samonte - Star's biological daughter 
 John Lloyd Cruz as Adrian Montecillo † - younger son of Mayla & Armand, also a younger brother of Patricia (biological) & Sheila (adoptive) and Chandro's younger half-brother.
 Armida Siguion-Reyna † as Lourdes Lizandro † - Mayla's mother and Adrian, Patricia (biological) and Sheila (adoptive)'s grandmother
 Cherie Gil † as Star - Sheila's biological mother.
 Mark Gil † as Mr. De Guzman - Abby's father.
 Rosemarie Gil as Emilia Villamines - Jordan and Dante's mother and also Patricia's mother-in-law.

Also as main
 Angelica Panganiban as Abby De Guzman - Nieves's younger daughter from Mr. De Guzman.
 Cherry Pie Picache as Becky Pagsisisihan - Patricia's godmother.
 Carlo Aquino as Eman Dela Cruz - son of Arsing from his first wife.
 Romnick Sarmenta as Chandro † - Dra. Enriquez's adoptive son, but also he's a biological son of Armand & Nieves and Patricia's long-lost half-brother.
 Timmy Cruz as Dra. Enriquez - Chandro (adoptive) and Adelaine's mother.
 Isabel Granada † as Adelaine Enriquez † - Dra. Enriquez's daughter and also she's a long-lost biological daughter of Franco.

Supporting
 Priscilla Almeda as Joey † 
 Steven Alonzo as Adrian's Friend 
 Jackie Castillejos as Cleo † 
 Menggie Cobarrubias † as Ramil
 Alma Concepcion as Benilda Villamines 
 Mymy Davao as Elaine 
 Hazel Espiñosa as Gemma Rose - Arsing's second wife.
 Daniel Fernando as Tonying - He's knows the truth about Patricia, Chandro and Shelia's true identities.
 Vivian Foz as Evelyn 
 Glenda Garcia as Lani's Mother 
 Gino Paul Guzman as Red Bernardo 
 Kathleen Hermosa as Babette 
 Simon Ibarra as Dr. Neil Guanzon
 Cherry Lou as Julie 
 Manjo del Mundo as Prison Warden 
 Aiza Marquez as Lani 
 Aya Medel as Dante's Mistress 
 Pen Medina as Abner Pacheco - Nieves' drunk husband.
 Melissa Mendez as Nelia Domingo - Carlo's aunt and also Patricia's godmother.
 Matthew Mendoza as Dante Villamines - Jordan's elder brother and also Patricia's brother-in-law.
 L.A. Mumar as Carlo Samonte 
 Belinda Panelo as Isabel Borromeo
 Lito Pimentel as Arsing Dela Cruz - Eman's father.
 Efren Reyes Jr. as Mr. Tordesillas 
 RJ Rosales † as Dexter Tolentino 
 Caridad Sanchez as Lolita Quevedo - Nieves's mother and Patricia (adoptive) Abby & Chandro (biological)'s grandmother.
 Jeffrey Santos as Virgo de Padua 
 Leni Santos as Elena 
 Monsour del Rosario as Mario † - Jordan and Patricia's Friend as Long Life.

Recurring, Extended, & Guest
 Yul Servo as Epoy 
 Jennifer Sevilla as Dr. Escoto
 Maricar Fernandez as Wendy - a prostitute contact by Chandro to have sex photo in a Hotel Room with Jordan.
 Joel Torre as Franco Dequiros Montecillo - Adelaine's biological father.
 Vic Vargas † as Mr. Villamines 
 Ann Villegas as Shiela's Cellmate 
 Dick Ysrael † as Tats

Production
In 2001, ABS-CBN reached its peak with its "timeless and memorable" telenovelas Pangako Sa ’Yo and Recuerdo de Amor. The series united fellow actors Judy Ann Santos and Piolo Pascual after their successful team-up in the phenomenal drama Esperanza the series would also be remembered as one of their chronicled team ups before their future roles especially the Award Winning Soap Sa Piling Mo in 2006. The series also served acclaim for Award Winning veteran actors Edu Manzano, Zsa Zsa Padilla, Coney Reyes and Ms. Armida Siguion-Reyna.

See also
 List of programs aired by ABS-CBN
 List of telenovelas of ABS-CBN

References

External links
 

ABS-CBN drama series
2001 Philippine television series debuts
2003 Philippine television series endings
Television series by Star Creatives
Filipino-language television shows
Television shows set in the Philippines